Donetsk is a town in Rostov Oblast, Russia, located on the Seversky Donets River on the border with Ukraine. Population:    38,000 (1970). It was previously known as Gundorovka.

History

The settlement was founded in 1681 by the Don Cossacks. It was known as Gundorovka until 1955. A museum called the Donetsk Museum of History and Ethnography was built in the city in 2005.

Administrative status
Within the framework of administrative divisions, it is incorporated as Donetsk Urban Okrug—an administrative unit with the status equal to that of the districts. As a municipal division, this administrative unit also has urban okrug status.

See also
Shelling of Donetsk, Russia

References

Sources

External links

Official website of Donetsk 
Donetsk Business Directory 

Cities and towns in Rostov Oblast
Don Host Oblast